Kill is a village and parish in County Kildare, Ireland near the county's border with Dublin beside the N7. Its population was recorded as 3,348 people in the 2016 census.

Kill is the birthplace of the Fenian John Devoy as well as home to two holders of the most senior ministry in the Irish government, the most powerful family in the 18th century Irish House of Commons and the birthplace of a leader of the opposition in the British House of Commons. The village won the European Entente Florale horticultural competition in 1987.

History
Excavations for the widening of the N7 in 2004 unearthed evidence of early habitation, including a late Bronze Age/early Iron Age hill fort and three small ring barrows. Kill (Cill Corbáin) was reputedly the burial place of the nine Ui Faeláin kings (later to become the O’Byrnes) who were based at Naas (Nás na Ríogh), the last of whom, Cerball mac Muirecáin, was buried in 909. The 'motte' of John de Hereford's castle, probably dating from  the 12th century, still survives on the outskirts of the village. A commandery for Knights Hospitallers was founded at Kilhill in the 13th century, by Maurice Fitzgerald, and chapters of the order were held here in 1326, 1332–34; it existed until the Reformation, when it was granted to John Alan.

The Whiteboys were active in Kill parish in 1775. The stopping of the mail coach in Kill in 1798 incited rebellion in the county. Kill Hill was the name used for the town in 18th-century maps, which mark a commons which was enclosed by an act of parliament in 1811.
During the Irish War of Independence, two Royal Irish Constabulary (RIC) men were shot dead at Greenhills on 21 August 1920. Broughal's pub was attacked by British forces, and the vacated RIC barracks were later burned down.

Turnpike to N7
Kill’s prominence through its history stems from its situation on the main road from Dublin to the south and south-west. The village was a staging post on the old toll road to Kilcullen, the first turnpike to be built (1729). It was here that horses were changed on the three-hour mail coach journey from Dublin to Kilcullen. The Old House, a turnpike inn, was originally built in 1794 and then rebuilt in 1943. Traffic increased dramatically on the road, (designated the T5 in 1926 and the N7 in 1977) in the middle years of the  20th century (2,000 a day in 1948, 3,800 in 1954, 4,500 in 1956, and 6,900 in 1962). Proposals to bypass the village, first published in 1952, were contested by the population, but Kill was the first of the three villages on the Dublin-Naas road to be by-passed when a single carriageway road, 28  feet wide, through the fields of the Old Glebe House to the north of the town, was opened by Gerard Sweetman on 15 June 1956. 

The name of the town proved ironic as the deadly impact of the road was quickly felt. The road claimed its first casualty, Straffan resident Margaret Hanafin even before its official opening on 1 June 1956, and four people died in the first major collision on the newly constructed bypass on 31 July. The Irish Times motoring correspondent described the road as:”...the most modern piece of road engineering in the country. The criticism had been made that the bypass was crossed by a local road, running from Kill to Straffan, about which the only warning on the main road was one small sign.” The accident rate was a factor in the postponement of the entire Naas road scheme  by the Fine Gael led coalition government in August 1956, leaving both the Johnstown and Rathcoole sections of the road in a semi-finished state until the re-election of a Fianna Fáil government.

The single carriageway by-pass was eventually replaced by a dual carriageway, opened by Neil Blaney on 25 June 1963, the first section of the Dublin-Naas road to be increased to four lanes. The local service station in Beaufort, owned by the Goosen family, became famous for its "open 24½ hours daily" sign. This road was poorly designed with broadside crossings of insufficient length to accommodate even a small motor car. Kill's new dual carriageway claimed 18 lives in its first three years of operation to 1966 and a total of 57 lives in all. Even after traffic lights were eventually installed at the Kill junction in November 1980 eleven more people died before a proper graded fly-over crossing was completed on 14 August 2006.

Economic life
Rabbit Falls at Hartwell, Arthurstown, Thornberry and Brookstown were first quarried in 1945 when Tom Roche set up the Castle Sand Company, later to become Roadstone, and in turn CRH Holdings, to become Ireland's largest multinational corporation with a turnover of €17bn (2010). The local quarries and offices of the company were major employers until they closed in 1982.

The economic transformation of Kill over this 30-year period was described by Ardclough schoolteacher Brigid Maguire in an Irish Press article previewing the opening of Goff's Horse Sales auditorium in 1975: “A decade or so ago the village of Kill, now by-passed by the dual carriageway from Naas to Dublin was small and insignificant. A few houses, a couple of pubs, two churches, a post office. An old low-ceilinged schoolhouse was dismally clamouring for demolition. Then, gravel was discovered and a company was formed. The Castle Sand Company, later to become Roadstone, sent dumpers and trucks along to ruffle the quiet of the village. Houses to hold workers and a new school were built, the chapel under the wing of the popular sagart pharóiste was built doubling its floor space. A posh hotel was built. Now, a further addition – a project to set up a new bloodstock sales emporium strikes the imagination as being the right thing in the right place.”

By the late 1970s, Kill was becoming a commuter town to Dublin.

Politics
Bishopscourt was home to John Ponsonby, speaker of the Irish House of Commons (1753–61), William Ponsonby, leader of the Irish Whigs (1789–1803) and birthplace of his brother George Ponsonby (1755–1817) leader of the Whig Party in the British House of Commons at Westminster (1808–17), his uncle Major-General Sir William Ponsonby (1772–1815) whose inept charge at the Battle of Waterloo resulted in his death at the hands of the Polish Lancers  and was studied as an example of failed battle strategy for generations afterwards, and of his sister Mary Ponsonby, wife of Charles Grey, British Prime Minister from 1830 to 1834, best known as the Earl Grey of the tea brand. Lady Ponsonby was mentioned in the Saul Dibb film, The Duchess. Ponsonby descendants include Sir Alec Douglas-Home (British Prime Minister, 1963–64), Nicky Haslam, and Princess Diana. 

Fenian leader John Devoy was born near Kill on 3 September 1842. Two Irish Ministers for Finance had local connections: Gerard Sweetman (Minister for Finance, 1954–57) lived in Killeen House and Charlie McCreevy, Irish Minister for Finance (1997–2004) and EU Commissioner for Internal Trade (2004-), attended the primary school in Kill. George Wolfe of nearby Forenaughts was a member of Dáil Éireann from 1923-32. Patrick Malone, Fine Gael TD for Kildare (1970–77) lived in Brookstown House, a mile outside the village.

Music
The village is the birthplace of the world-renowned Uilleann piper Liam O'Flynn and Heidi Talbot, a solo artist and the voice of Irish-American group Cherish the Ladies. The local "Kill Singers" choral group has had many successes in recent years in competitions in Ireland and overseas. The group practice in the local primary school on Wednesday evenings, except during the summer. Additionally, the local "Kill Musical and Dramatic Society" specialises in musical and theatrical performance. The society's productions are held at the local St. Brigid's Church, and notable recent productions have included the pantomime 'Entangled'.

Churches
The village has two churches; St Brigid's (Catholic) Church and St John's (Church of Ireland).  The latter contains an unusual organ (normal colour of keys is reversed) donated by the Bourke (Earls of Mayo) family, who were the landlords based in Palmerstown House in the 18th and 19th centuries, and a rare "half door" at the entrance to the building, outside of which is an early stone font.

In the Catholic Church, the parish of Kill was united with that of nearby Lyons in 1693.  The current Catholic church was built in 1821 and extended in 1973. The chapel bell in Kill was said to have been the first in Ireland to ring in celebration of Catholic Emancipation in 1829. 

St Brigid's Well in Hartwell (probably an earlier site of worship) was a place of pilgrimage until the 19th century and a sally tree covered with votive rags was recorded here in the 1890s. There are ruins of another 14th-century church in Kerdiffstown.

Social activities and clubs
Branches of Muintir na Tíre (1954) and Macra na Feirme (1955) were established in the village. There is an active branch of the Irish Countrywomen's Association (ICA)'s most famous chairperson was Patsy Lawlor, née Broughal, President, 1976-79. The Kill History Group, which meets in the Parish Meeting Room on the fourth Monday of the month, discusses topics of local interest.

Sport

Kill was the location of the Irish Masters in snooker from 1979 to 2000, at Goff's sales ring.

Kill GAA reached the semi-finals of the Kildare SF championships in 1962. Kill player Kieran O'Malley was a member of the Kildare team that contested the 1958 National Football League final. Kill GAA club also won both Junior A and Junior B County football championships, the Jack Higgins Cup, and were awarded club of the year in 1992. A field now overrun by the N7 staged the 1939 Leinster camogie final.

Motorcyclist Ernie Lyons won the Senior Manx Grand Prix in 1946.

Equestrian
Ted Walsh, 11-time Irish amateur champion jockey and trainer of the Grand National winning horse Papillion 2001 and Irish national/triumph hurdle/Heineken gold cup winner Commanche Court has his stables on the outskirts of Kill. His son, Ruby Walsh, rode both horses and was Irish National Hunt champion in 2007. Jockey Brendan Sheridan attended Kill National School. Horse breeder Edward "Cub" Kennedy ran a stud farm in the 1920s at Bishopscourt.

Showjumper Iris Kellett won the Queen Elizabeth Cup (1949) and the Ladies European championship in 1969. Kill is home to Goffs Horse Sales Centre. Long before Grand National winning horses Papillion and Commanche Court were trained in Kill by Ted Walsh. Captain Christy (winner Cheltenham Gold Cup, 1974), and Kicking King (winner Cheltenham Gold Cup, 2005) were trained in Alasty by father and son Pat and  Tom Taaffe, respectively.  As a jockey, Pat Taaffe (1930–1992) rode two winners of the English Grand National, Quare Times (1955) and Gay Trip (1970), and was Irish National Hunt champion six times.

People
The disgraced Percy Jocelyn, Bishop of Clogher, was once stationed in Kill and lived in the Glebe House there circa 1815. He was succeeded by John Warburton, son of Charles Warburton, Bishop of Limerick from 1806 to 1820. Patrick Dunne of Greenhills, a cousin of John Devoy was captain of Óglaigh na hÉireann in Kill during both the Irish War of Independence and the Civil War.

• Adam Byrne, rugby player
• John Devoy, Irish republican rebel and journalist
• Patsy Lawlor, politician
• Philip Lawlor, former rugby player
• Ernie Lyons, motorcycle racer
• Emer McLysaght, journalist and author
• Liam O'Flynn, uilleann piper and Irish traditional musician.
• Heidi Talbot, musician
• James Tracy, rugby player
• Katie Walsh, former jockey
• Ruby Walsh, former jockey

See also
 Kildare
 List of towns and villages in Ireland

Further reading

References

External links
Information about Kill

Towns and villages in County Kildare
Civil parishes of County Kildare